Ty Dennis (born January 19, 1971) is an American drummer best known for his work with The Doors revival band Manzarek-Krieger and the Robby Krieger Band.

Early life
Ty was born in 1971 and grew up in Garden Grove, California, near Disneyland.  He graduated from Garden Grove High School, the Argonauts, in 1989.  His father is an accomplished jazz drummer. He spent his childhood there before moving to Los Angeles as a teenager.

Career
By 1995, Ty became established as a session musician in Los Angeles, playing many styles of music including rock, jazz and fusion. His favorite musician and biggest influence is Herbie Hancock.

He spent some time drumming for The Motels featuring Martha Davis when he met bassist Angelo Barbera who was playing bass for the Robby Krieger Band. When the Robby Krieger Band needed a new drummer in 2001 Barbera recommended Ty for the job and he got it. When Stewart Copeland broke his arm after falling off a bicycle in 2003, Dennis filled in for him in The Doors of the 21st Century, the newly reformed version of The Doors which was led by Robby Krieger and organist Ray Manzarek. After playing for them for several months, it became clear that Copeland would not return and Dennis was the new permanent drummer for the band. He has remained with them ever since, throughout all of their name changes.

Equipment
Dennis uses DW drums, Ludwig snare drums, Aquarian drumheads, Bosphorus cymbals, Vic Firth drumsticks and SKB cases.

Drums: DW VLT series in champagne sparkle or broken glass finish (drums going from left to right): 
 22" bass drum 
 12" rack tom 
 10" rack tom 
 14" floor tom 
 16" floor tom 
 14" VLT maple snare 
 13" Edge series snare 
 various Ludwig metal snares

Cymbals: Bosphorus: 
 14" Gold hi-hats 
 18" Versa crash w/ rivets/10" Traditional splash (stacked) 
 18" Traditional crash/ride 
 21" Traditional medium ride 
 19" Traditional ride (used as crash) 
 13" Turk hi-hats (aux hi-hats) 
 18" Gold china/8" Gold splash (stacked) 
 20" Traditional china

Drumsticks: Vic Firth: 
 Vic Firth Extreme 5B wood tip

References

External links
Official Website

1971 births
Living people
People from Garden Grove, California
Musicians from California
20th-century American drummers
American male drummers
21st-century American drummers
20th-century American male musicians
21st-century American male musicians